Mali Lipovec may refer to:

 Mali Lipovec, Žužemberk, a village in Slovenia
 Mali Lipovec, Croatia, a village near Samobor, Croatia